This is a list of Dutch television related events from 1997.

Events
23 November - Mary Ann Morales wins the thirteenth series of Soundmixshow, performing as Lea Salonga.

Debuts

International
11 September – // Billy the Cat

Television shows

1950s
NOS Journaal (1956–present)

1970s
Sesamstraat (1976–present)

1980s
Jeugdjournaal (1981–present)
Soundmixshow (1985-2002)
Het Klokhuis (1988–present)

1990s
Goede tijden, slechte tijden (1990–present)
Goudkust (1996-2001)

Ending this year

Births

Deaths